Peter Klein may refer to:

Peter Klein (athlete) (born 1959), West German sprinter
Peter D. Klein (born 1940), American professor of philosophy
Peter W. Klein (born 1970), American journalist and documentary filmmaker
Peter G. Klein (born 1966), American professor of economics
Peter Klein (tenor) (1907–1992), German tenor
Peter Klein (CFO), Microsoft executive
Peter Klein (impresario) (born 1945), American impresario